Sukhwinder Amrit (born 1963) is a Punjabi poet and Ghazal singer. In November 2017 she was among nine female poets who received a Sulabh Sahitya Akademi Award at the All-India Poetess Conference.

Life 
Sukhwinder was in Sadarpura, in Jagraon tehsil, Punjab. She had one brother and was the eldest among her four sisters. She started writing poetry in her childhood though she had a terrible childhood. One day, her mother came across her notebook where she used to write poems. The end result was her notebook was burnt and she was beaten badly. She got married at the age of seventeen when she was in class nine. Life did not change much after her marriage, but due to her strong conviction and determination to learn and continue writing poems, she won the heart of her husband, Amarjit, and started her education. She started her schooling from 10th class when her children were also studying in the same school. She subsequently completed a M.A. degree in Punjabi literature. She served as a lecturer at Govt college, Ludhiana for one year.

Works

Collection of her poems 
 "Kanian/Kaniyaan" (2000)
 "Dhupp di Chunni" (2006)
 "Chirian"    (2014)
 "Dhuan" (Poem in Book Kanian Page 28 )
 "Sabak"  (Poem in Book Kanian Page 31)
 "Neeleya Mora ve" (Geet)(2012)
 "Lafjaa di Dargaah" (Edit) (1999)
 "Risteyaa Di Rangoli" (Edit) (2014)
 "Kannuprya (Translation of Poetry Book Kannuprya of Padamsri Dharamvir Bharati For Punjabi Academy Delhi 2018)

Collection of her Ghazals 
 Suraj di Dehleez (1997)
 Chiraghan di Daar(1999)
 Patjhar/Patjhad wich Pungarde Patte(2002)
 Hazar Rangan Di Laat(2008)
 Punian/Puniyaan (2011)
 Kesar De Chhitte (edited 2003)

References 

1963 births
Living people
Punjabi-language poets
Indian ghazal singers
Women ghazal singers
Singers from Punjab, India
Women musicians from Punjab, India
20th-century Indian women singers
20th-century Indian singers